Ambari is a locality in Guwahati, India.  Located North West of Guwahati, it is a site for important archaeological excavations related to ancient Assam.

Some important buildings located here like Guwahati Press Club, Asom Gana Parishad Office, Gauhati University City Office, Assam State Museum, District Library and Rabindra Bhawan.

See also
 Bhetapara
 Beltola
 Chandmari
 Ganeshguri
 Fatasil Ambari: Fatasil Ambari is a region located in Guwahati. Fatasil Ambari - Guwahati on the map. Fatasil Ambari (Guwahati), Assam, India

References

Neighbourhoods in Guwahati